Ben Lomond Mountain may refer to:

 Ben Lomond Mountain AVA, California wine region in Santa Cruz County
 Ben Lomond Mountain (California), a mountain in the Santa Cruz Mountains in Santa Cruz County, California
 Ben Lomond Mountain (Utah), Ogden, Utah
 Ben Lomond (North Shore Mountains), formerly Ben Lomond Mountain, a mountain in British Columbia, Canada